Heterochyta aprepta is a moth in the family Xyloryctidae. It was described by Turner in 1947. It is found in Australia, where it has been recorded from Western Australia.

References

Heterochyta
Moths described in 1947